The Four Nations Rugby Squad is a biennial rugby tournament representing the top three nations of the sport including an additional underperforming team. Australia, England and New Zealand are the top three nations excelling in the game. The event is recognized as Ladbroke Four Nations because the tournament is sponsored by Ladbrokes, a British gambling company. The squads competing in the 2016 rugby tournament consists of Australia, England, New Zealand and Scotland. The rosters for each squad below consist of player’s information and the head coach of each team.

Squads

Australia  

Head Coach:  Mal Meninga

On October 4, Mal Meninga named the following 24 players as part of his squad in preparation for the tournament.

* Replaced Josh Papalii who withdrew due to injury on 13 October.

England  

Head Coach:  Wayne Bennett

On October 10, Wayne Bennett named the following 24 players as part of his squad in preparation for the tournament.

* Replaced Brett Ferres who withdrew due to injury on October 18.

New Zealand  

Head Coach:  David Kidwell

On October 4, David Kidwell named the following 24 players as part of his squad in preparation for the tournament.

* Replaced Simon Mannering who withdrew due to injury on October 18.

Scotland  

Head Coach:  Steve McCormack

On October 11, Steve McCormack named the following 24 players as part of his squad in preparation for the tournament.

References

Rugby League Four Nations
2016 in rugby league